Sankhavaram is a village in Kakinada district in the state of Andhra Pradesh in India.

References 

Villages in Kakinada district